Sutkus is the masculine form of a Lithuanian surname. Its feminine forms  are: Sutkienė (married woman or widow) and Sutkutė (unmarried woman). Notable people with the surname include:

Antanas Sutkus (born 1939), Lithuanian photographer 
Bruno Sutkus (1924–2003), German sniper

Lithuanian-language surnames